Fat Mattress II is the second studio album by English folk rock band Fat Mattress, released in 1970.

Reception

Compared with the band's debut self-titled album, Fat Mattress II was a commercial failure, not appearing in any major record charts. The album was described, in a review for music website allmusic, by critic Richie Unterberger as "similar to, but also inferior to, their debut." Unterberger went on to suggest that "The songs aren't even up to the debut's modest standard, however, and the lingering feeling is that of a tolerable but fairly anonymous '60s-turning-into-'70s band with a Transatlantic feel."

Track listing

Personnel
Fat Mattress
Neil Landon – vocals, production
Jimmy Leverton – bass, vocals, production
Eric Dillon – drums, production
Steve Hammond – guitar, production
Mick Weaver – keyboards, production
Additional personnel
Noel Redding – guitar on tracks 2, 4, 5, 6, 10, & 11
George Chkiantz – engineering
Roger Wilkinson – engineering on "The Storm" and "Highway"
Gered Mankowitz – photography

Release history

References

General

Specific

External links

1970 albums
Fat Mattress albums
Polydor Records albums
Atco Records albums
Sanctuary Records albums
Esoteric Recordings albums
Sequel Records albums
Albums produced by Neil Landon